Kirovsky is the westernmost of the seven city districts that make up the city of Perm in Perm Krai, Russia, located on the right bank of the Kama River. As of the 2010 Census, the population was 127,793, up from 126,960 in 2002, and 138,607 in 1989.  It is composed of 10 smaller microdistricts, and has a total land area of 404 square kilometers, or 156.1 square miles.  Out of all of the city districts that make up Perm, Kirovsky has the highest percent of land being used for parks, at 75%.  It has an industry-based economy.  Out of the other six city districts, it's only neighbor is Dzerzhinsky.

History
The first permanent settlement in the area was Orborino, which was established in 1614 as a garrison to protect the local nobility's forest estates.  The first true village, Zabornaya was founded in the year 1816, and was once again a noble possession.  It developed a strong charcoal industry in the 1860's that lasted until the early 1890's.  In the following decades, numerous smaller hamlets would appear around the growing town, many eventually becoming microdistricts.  Eventfully, in 1930, Zabornaya and a few nearby hamlets were linked to the city of Perm and merged to form the work settlement of Zamask, which was then merged with the remaining rural hamlets on January 18, 1941, to form the modern city district of Kirovsky.

References

City districts of Perm, Russia